Susquehannock Trail Performance Rally (STPR) is an annual rally racing event held in Wellsboro, Pennsylvania.  STPR was part of the Rally America National Rally Championship, and in 2017 it became sanctioned by the American Rally Association. It is considered "one of the most exciting rallies on the Rally America circuit."

History

Past winners

References

External links

 Official website

Rally competitions in the United States
Motorsport in Pennsylvania
Rally America